The sixth season of Married at First Sight premiered on 28 January 2019 on the Nine Network. Relationship experts John Aiken, Mel Schilling and Trisha Stratford all returned from the previous season to match 10 brides and 10 grooms together. Halfway through the experiment, the experts matched another 2 brides and 2 grooms together.

Couple profiles

Commitment ceremony history

  This couple elected to leave the experiment during the commitment ceremony.

Controversy
The experts had to decide on a controversial request by Dan and Jess who wanted to leave their respective "spouses" but remain in the experiment as a couple. The experts allowed the couple to leave their previous matches and stay in the experiment as a new couple. As a result of the decision, an online petition garnered thousands of votes to have the show cancelled.

Ratings

References

6
2019 Australian television seasons
Television shows filmed in Australia